Lasciate ogni speranza is a 1937 Italian comedy film directed by Gennaro Righelli and starring Antonio Gandusio, María Denis and Rosina Anselmi.

Cast
 Antonio Gandusio as Pasquale Grifone  
 María Denis as Gina Grifone  
 Rosina Anselmi as Filomena Grifone 
 Giorgio De Rege as Giovanni
 Guido De Rege as Arturo
 Elli Parvo as Gemma
 Maria Dominiani as Assunta  
 Mario Siletti as Jack Hilton 
 Angelo Bizzari 
 Mario Colli 
 Rocco D'Assunta 
 Walter Grant  
 Edwige Masing
 Giulio Mostocotto 
 Luigi Pellegrini
 Edoardo Toniolo

Production
Raffaele Colamonici hired Riccardo Freda as the screenwriter for the film, adapting the play L'agonia di Schizzo by Athos Setti. Freda would later dismiss the film and his other works of the era as "small comedies without any importance" Freda stated he wrote the film with his friend Edoardo Antonelli.

Release
Lasciate ogni speranza was released in October 1937.

References

Bibliography

External links 
 

1937 comedy films
Italian comedy films
1937 films
1930s Italian-language films
Films directed by Gennaro Righelli
Italian black-and-white films
1930s Italian films